The Czech Republic participated in the 2008 Summer Olympics in Beijing, China. The Czech delegation consisted of around 130 athletes.

Medalists

Archery

Athletics

Men
Track & road events

Field events

Combined events – Decathlon

Women
Track & road events

Field events

Combined events – Heptathlon

Badminton

Basketball

Women's tournament

Roster

Group play

Quarterfinals

Canoeing

Slalom

Sprint

Qualification Legend: QS = Qualify to semi-final; QF = Qualify directly to final

Cycling

Road

Track
Sprint

Pursuit

Keirin

Omnium

Mountain biking

BMX

Equestrian

Eventing

Gymnastics

Artistic
Men

Women

Trampoline

Judo

Modern pentathlon

* Did not finish

Rowing

Men

Women

Qualification Legend: FA=Final A (medal); FB=Final B (non-medal); FC=Final C (non-medal); FD=Final D (non-medal); FE=Final E (non-medal); FF=Final F (non-medal); SA/B=Semifinals A/B; SC/D=Semifinals C/D; SE/F=Semifinals E/F; QF=Quarterfinals; R=Repechage

* Jitka Antošová fell ill during the course of the competition and was replaced by Miroslava Knapková at the final.

Sailing

Men

Women

Open

M = Medal race; EL = Eliminated – did not advance into the medal race; CAN = Race cancelled

Shooting

Men

Women

Swimming

Men

Women

Synchronized swimming

Table tennis

Tennis

Men

Women

Triathlon

Weightlifting

Wrestling

Men's Greco-Roman

 Marek Švec originally finished fifth, but in November 2016, he was promoted to bronze due to disqualification of Asset Mambetov.

References 

Nations at the 2008 Summer Olympics
2008
Olympics